Matilda Aslizadeh is a practicing visual artist and educator.  She was born in Iran and moved to Greece after the Iranian Revolution in 1979. A few years later, her family settled in Vancouver, British Columbia, Canada, where Matilda still lives on the unceded Musqueam, Squamish, and Tsleil-Waututh territories.  

Aslizadeh utilizes video, photography and installation to rethink narrative structures such as the "classic fall and redemption narrative."  She has also artistically and pedagogically explored expanding media archeology into non-western practices "that incorporate old and new immersive technologies to understand how they enable engagement with other cosmologies that continue to co-exist and co-evolve in our global context of accelerated capitalism."

Select work

In a dark wood 
Aslizadeh's 2009 work, In a dark wood, features an animated roulette-spin of B.C. trees, spaced as if they were Greek pillars.  It is influenced by the turmoil of her youth, and the artifacts of different ancient and living cultures can be seen in her practice, including this work. The two-channel work layers footage into a sorting, "with short bursts of archival, black-and-white film footage culled from British Columbia's history" intertwining geographical locations.

Moly and Kassandra 
Curated by Grant Arnold and part of Capture's Selected Exhibition Program, Aslizadeh exhibited Moly and Kassandra, 2018 at the Vancouver Art Gallery in 2020.  The installation features three operatic performances by individual female figures in front of open pit mines, mimicking an amphitheatre. Arnold describes the work as building a "correlation between the terms in which abstract economic systems are represented and the physical extraction of raw materials by precisely interweaving statistical charts, images of monumental excavations into the surface of the earth and scenes of operatic divination." Using references from 1979 fashion and history connects to the shift from Keynesian to neoliberal economic policies, the work reflects on the consequences economy in late-capitalism. Helena Wadsley rereads the work again in the year it was being shown and developing a relationship to COVID-19's emptiness.

Art Mamas 
Aslizadeh is a founding member of the artist collective A.M. (Art Mamas). The Vancouver-based group is made up of nine artists at different stages of both motherhood and their careers; they have been meeting regularly since the spring of 2016. The collective finds ways to facilitate a support system for artist caregivers while critically exploring the place of motherhood and care work within the dominant culture of art production. As part of Art Mamas’ 2021 residency at Access Gallery PLOT, (with Gabriela Aceves-Sepúlveda, Robyn Laba, Natasha McHardy, Maria Anna Parolin, Heather Passmore, Sarah Shamash, prOphecy sun and Damla Tamer) the gallery space was activated as a laboratory and included other creative producers who are mothers/parents from the local community and beyond.  Conversations and screenings featured artists Margaret Dragu, Jin-me Yoon, and Elizabeth MacKenzie.

References 

1976 births
Living people
Iranian emigrants to Canada
Artists from Vancouver
Canadian art educators
University of British Columbia alumni
University of California, San Diego alumni